Laguna de Sayula ("Sayula Lake") is a lake located in the southern area of Jalisco, about 60 km from Guadalajara. It is located in the municipalities of Sayula, Zacoalco de Torres, Amacueca, Teocuitatlán de Corona, Atoyac and Techaluta de Montenegro.

The lake level has gradually been lowering since 1993 but it still supports a large variety of wildlife.

Physical environment

Geographic location 
Laguna de Sayula is found in the Zacoalco-Guzmán water system, right between the Tapalpa Mountains and the Mazamitla Mountains, in the central part of Southern Jalisco.  The coordinates of its borders are:
North 
West 
South 
East 

One finds the municipalities of Sayula, Amacueca, Techaluta de Montenegro, and Atoyac around the lake.

Geological formation

Hydrography of the lake 
Laguna de Sayula is a wetland with Ramsar (an important place for bird conservation), the wetlands are ecosystems where water is the main factor controlling the environment, vegetable life and animals associated with it. The lakes of the closed Sayula-Atotonilco basin form part of the endorheic lakes of the neo-volcanic axis.  But Laguna de Sayula is especially important because of its relation to the migratory habitats of the North American birds.

Flora 
Because the lake is salty, the vegetation found nearby is highly tolerant to salt. Along with these, there are low-lying vegetation that surrounds the lake.. The aquatic plants found in the lake is sparse, and can only be found in small pockets of freshwater in the area. The tropical deciduous forest vegetation can be found in higher altitudes, atop of hills and islands on the lake.

The flora that can be found around the lake includes: 
 Seashore saltgrass (Distichlis spicata and Sporobolus pyramidatus)
 Sea purslane (Sesuvium portulacastrum)
 Seepweeds (Suaeda torreyana)
 Smooth Mesquite (Prosopis laevigata)
 Madras Thorn (Pithecellobium dulce)
 Sweet Acacia (Acacia farnesiana)
 Southern cattail (Typha domingensis)
 Baraima (Bacopa monnieri)
 Fat Duckweed (Lemna gibba)
 Fragrant Bursera (Bursera fagaroides)
 Frangipani (Plumeria rubra)
 Isolatocereus dumortieri (Isolatocereus dumortieri)
 Cheilanthes sinuata (Cheilanthes sinuata)
 Cheilanthes lozanoi (Cheilanthes lozanoi)
 Mammillaria scrippsiana (Mammillaria scrippsiana)
 Ball Moss (Tillandsia recurvata)
 Ficus goldmanii (Ficus goldmanii)
 Ficus insipida (Ficus insipida) 
 Ficus padifolia (Ficus padifolia)

Fauna 
The wildlife found around the lake is very diverse; it is common to see birds in the winter, of the species Chen caerulescens, Chorlito tildío, and Charadrius vociferus, along with turtles, eagles, insects and hawks.

References

Ramsar sites in Mexico
Protected areas of Jalisco
Sayula